Uroš Matić (born 23 May 1990) is a Serbian professional footballer who plays for Abha in the Saudi Professional League.

Club career
Matić was born in Šabac in the Serbian Federal Republic. Moving from youth football to MFK Košice in 2008, he made his debut on 30 May 2009 as a substitute in second half of the match against Tatran Prešov. On 9 March 2013, in a 2–1 loss to Spartak Myjava, he scored a goal similar to one scored by Arjen Robben, but during extra time, he missed a penalty, firing the ball into the arms of Myjava goalkeeper Peter Solnička.

In early 2013, Matić joined his brother at Benfica in Portugal. on a 1-year contract with the option to extend it for a further five years. In 2014, at the same time as his brother left for Chelsea, he went on a trial at NAC Breda, who later, signed him on a permanent deal.

On 26 July 2020, Matić signed a three-year contract with Qarabağ FK. Matić left Qarabağ on 26 July 2021.

On 26 July 2021, Matić signed a two-year contract with Saudi club Abha.

International career
Matić made four appearances for the Serbia national under-19 football team at the 2009 UEFA European Under-19 Football Championship.

Personal life
Matić's older brother, Nemanja, plays for Roma and the Serbia national team. Matić's maternal grandfather was born in Volkovija, now North Macedonia, then settled with his family in Serbia; he has talked about joining the Macedonian national team (as he is eligible through his descent).

Honours

Club
Copenhagen
 Danish Superliga: 2016–17
 Danish Cup: 2016–17

References

External links
 
 
 

Living people
1990 births
Sportspeople from Šabac
Serbian people of Macedonian descent
Serbian footballers
Serbian expatriate footballers
Serbia youth international footballers
Association football midfielders
FC VSS Košice players
S.L. Benfica B players
NAC Breda players
SK Sturm Graz players
F.C. Copenhagen players
FK Austria Wien players
APOEL FC players
Qarabağ FK players
Abha Club players
Eredivisie players
Eerste Divisie players
Slovak Super Liga players
Austrian Football Bundesliga players
Danish Superliga players
Cypriot First Division players
Azerbaijan Premier League players
Saudi Professional League players
Expatriate footballers in Slovakia
Serbian expatriate sportspeople in Slovakia
Expatriate footballers in Portugal
Serbian expatriate sportspeople in Portugal
Expatriate footballers in the Netherlands
Serbian expatriate sportspeople in the Netherlands
Expatriate men's footballers in Denmark
Serbian expatriate sportspeople in Denmark
Expatriate footballers in Austria
Serbian expatriate sportspeople in Austria
Expatriate footballers in Cyprus
Serbian expatriate sportspeople in Cyprus
Expatriate footballers in Azerbaijan
Serbian expatriate sportspeople in Azerbaijan
Expatriate footballers in Saudi Arabia
Serbian expatriate sportspeople in Saudi Arabia